Intigam Bayram oglu Asgarli was an Azerbaijani military officer.

Early life and military service 
Intigam Asgarli was born on 16 August 1990, in Vilash (or Kalinovka), Masally District of the Azerbaijan.
He served as a soldier after he was educated in the village where he was born. After reading the warrant officer course, he continued to serve in the army as a warrant officer. He fought as a warrant officer of the Azerbaijani Army in the 2016 Nagorno-Karabakh Conflict.
Intigam Asgarli took part in the 2020 Nagorno-Karabakh war, which started on 27 September. Participating in the Battle of Shusha (2020), he fought in the offensives in Shusha. Intigam Asgarli was shot on November 9, 2020, during a combat mission in Shusha between Armenian and Azerbaijani servicemen.

Awards 
 Asgarli was awarded the title of the Hero of the Patriotic War on 9 December 2020, by the decree of the President Aliyev.
 Asgarli was awarded the For Fatherland Medal for the second time on 15 December 2020, by the decree of the President Aliyev.
 Asgarli was awarded the For the Liberation of Shusha Medal on 29 December 2020, by the decree of the President Aliyev.

References 

1990 births
2020 deaths
People from Masally District
Heroes of the Patriotic War
People killed in the 2020 Nagorno-Karabakh war
Azerbaijani Land Forces personnel of the 2020 Nagorno-Karabakh war